Fumonelix archeri (syn. Mesodon archeri) is a species of land snail in the family Polygyridae known commonly as Archer's toothed land snail and Ocoee covert. It is endemic to Tennessee in the United States, where it is known only from Goforth Creek in Polk County.

References

Polygyridae
Gastropods described in 1940
Endemic fauna of the United States
Natural history of Tennessee
Polk County, Tennessee
Taxonomy articles created by Polbot
Taxobox binomials not recognized by IUCN